Mohammed Kasola (born on August 13, 1985, in Accra) is a naturalized Qatari footballer. He currently plays as a centre back .

Club career statistics
Statistics accurate as of 21 August 2011

1Includes Emir of Qatar Cup.
2Includes Sheikh Jassem Cup.
3Includes AFC Champions League.

International career
He has made his first appearance for the senior Qatar national football team in a friendly match against Slovenia on March 3, 2010.
He scored his first goal in a friendly against Russia in the 4th minute, and also gave his team an early lead in the 6th minute against Vietnam.

Kasola gained nationwide eminence for scoring a late equalizer in the 86th minute against Iran in the third round of the 2014 World Cup qualifiers. Qatar, entering the match with a 9-goal advantage over Bahrain, who were 3 points behind them, were trailing 2–1 in the second half of the match held in Iran. Meanwhile, Bahrain, who were beating Indonesia 10–0 in a home match in very controversial circumstances, looked to go through to the next round until Kasola's goal saved Qatar from elimination. Similarly, there was some controversy over Kasola's goal, but it was not pursued by FIFA. As a reward for scoring the goal, Kasola received an Arabian camel.

International goals
Scores and results list Qatar's goal tally first.

References

External links

 Goalzz.com Player Profile

1986 births
Living people
Qatari footballers
Qatar international footballers
Ghanaian footballers
Mesaimeer SC players
Al-Khor SC players
Al Sadd SC players
Al-Rayyan SC players
Umm Salal SC players
2011 AFC Asian Cup players
Qatar Stars League players
Qatari Second Division players
Ghanaian emigrants to Qatar
Naturalised citizens of Qatar
Qatari people of Ghanaian descent
Footballers from Accra
Association football central defenders